CUB and sushi domain-containing protein 2 is a protein that in humans is encoded by the CSMD2 gene.

References

External links

Further reading